was a  after Reiki and before Jinki. This period spanned the years from November 717 through February 724.

Change of era
 717 : The new era name was created to mark an event or series of events.  The previous era ended and the new one commenced in Reiki 3, on the 17th day of the 11th month of 717.

Events of the Yōrō era
 717 (Yōrō 1, 3rd month): The sadaijin Isonokami no Maro died at age 78.
 717 (Yōrō 1, 9th month): Empress Genshō traveled through Ōmi Province where she was met by the lords of the San'indō, the San'yōdō and the Nankaidō; and she was entertained with singing and dancing. From there, she traveled to Mino Province where the lords of the Tōkaidō, Tōsandō and Hokurikudō who rendered similar honors and entertainments.
 721 (Yōrō 5, 5th month): The newly completed Nihon Shoki in 30 volumes was offered to the Empress.
 721 (Yōrō 5, 5th month): The udaijin Fujiwara no Fuhito died at age 62.
 721 (Yōrō 5, 5th month): The former-Empress Genmei died at age 61.

Notes

References
 Asakawa, Kan'ichi. (1903).   The Early Institutional Life of Japan. Tokyo: Shueisha.  OCLC 4427686;  see online, multi-formatted, full-text book at openlibrary.org
 Brown, Delmer M. and Ichirō Ishida, eds. (1979).  Gukanshō: The Future and the Past. Berkeley: University of California Press. ;  OCLC 251325323
 Nussbaum, Louis-Frédéric. and Käthe Roth. (2005).  Japan encyclopedia. Cambridge: Harvard University Press. ;  OCLC 58053128
 Titsingh, Isaac. (1834). Nihon Ōdai Ichiran; ou,  Annales des empereurs du Japon.  Paris: Royal Asiatic Society, Oriental Translation Fund of Great Britain and Ireland. OCLC 5850691
 Varley, H. Paul. (1980). A Chronicle of Gods and Sovereigns: Jinnō Shōtōki of Kitabatake Chikafusa. New York: Columbia University Press.  ;  OCLC 6042764

External links
 National Diet Library, "The Japanese Calendar" -- historical overview plus illustrative images from library's collection

Japanese eras
8th century in Japan
717 beginnings
724 endings